"Cha-Ka" is the first episode of the first season of the 1974 American television series Land of the Lost. Written by David Gerrold and directed by Dennis Steinmetz, it first aired in the United States on September 7, 1974 on NBC.

Plot
An enormous earthquake plunges Rick, Will, and Holly Marshall "down a thousand feet below" to the Land of the Lost while river-rafting. When their raft washes ashore, they are met with a tyrannosaur they soon dub "Grumpy", who chases them till they reach a homely cave located up a steep cliff.

Presumably the next day, the Marshalls begin to explore the jungle and encounter a browsing Coelophysis, whom Holly decides to name "Spot" (to Will's chagrin). However, they are soon chased off by Grumpy. While hiding in the bracken, Rick suggests that the crack through which they fell in their raft was a "hole in space" and that they have entered another world using the presence of three moons in the sky to back up his claim.

After further running, Rick tells Will and Holly to lie in wait while he sees if the route to the cave is safe. While in hiding, Will and Holly hear the sound of chanting and head toward the source, believing it to come from humans. They run into a clearing where they discover a large, metallic "pylon" which emits a high-pitched whirring sound. To the touch it is unnaturally smooth and cold.

Remembering the chanting, the siblings head to the tree line and observe three manlike simians attempting to create a fire while chanting an invocation in their native language. The creatures are interrupted in their ritual by Grumpy, who wounds the leg of the smallest of the creatures. The tyrannosaur gives chase to the remaining two and Holly runs out to rescue the wounded one. Will carries him back to their hiding place in the bracken where they discover that the creature's right leg is sprained. Will and Holly are able to glean from the creature that his name is Cha-Ka and that his people are called "Pakuni".

When Rick returns, he decides to take Cha-Ka to the cave, where their supplies can be used to mend his leg. Realizing the Paku cannot scale the cliff in his condition, Rick lowers a lift from the cave which they have apparently constructed to haul supplies, but the endeavor is interrupted by the return of Grumpy, forcing Will and Cha-Ka to take shelter in the rocks while Rick and Holly hide in the cave. Rick and Holly take a sharpened stick which they refer to as the "flyswatter" and stab Grumpy in his open mouth, forcing him to flee. Cha-Ka is then carried up to the cave where Rick makes a splint. While preparing dinner, Holly uses a lighter, which greatly fascinates Cha-Ka. He refers to it as "Ota" in stunned tones.

During the night Cha-Ka steals the lighter and limps off to find his fellow Pakuni. The Marshalls secretly follow him, but are threatened by the two elder Pakuni, Ta and Sa. During the scuffle, Grumpy returns and frightens both Cha-Ka and the others away. The Marshalls make their way to the safety of their cave, believing Cha-Ka to have left them.

The next morning, however, a feast of native fruits have been placed on their doorstep by Cha-Ka, who watches them smiling from the bushes. The Marshalls conclude that Cha-Ka has become their friend. The episode closes with Grumpy roaming the jungle.

Reception
The online review site Premium Hollywood described the episode in 2009 as "really a very boring start for the series", adding that it was likely toned down to avoid frightening its young viewership.

In Sid and Marty Krofft: A Critical Study of Saturday Morning Children's Television, 1969-1993, film and television historian Hal Erickson praises Land of the Lost for not revealing all the details of the show's premise in the first episode, instead spreading out plot revelations throughout the first season.  In "Cha-ka", only the dinosaurs and Pakuni are revealed; later episodes would introduce the Sleestak and other elements of the program's mythology.  Erickson contrasts this with "standard operating procedure in the 1970s ... to lay all the cards on the table in the opening episode", and lauds the show's creators Sid and Marty Krofft for "having enough confidence in [their] young audience to unfold [the] series' exposition over a matter of weeks rather than minutes".

References

External links
 

Land of the Lost (1974 TV series) episodes
1974 American television episodes